Jan Veri (also Romanized as Jān Verī) is a village in Surak Rural District, Lirdaf District, Jask County, Hormozgan Province, Iran. At the 2006 census, its population was 172, in 44 families.

References 

Populated places in Jask County